Kim Jong-pil (1926-2018) was a South Korean politician who served as Prime Minister.

Kim Jong-pil may also refer to:
Kim Jong-pil (footballer, born 1955)
Kim Jong-pil (footballer, born 1956)
Kim Jong-pil (footballer, born 1992)